St. George's Grammar School may refer to:
 St. George's Grammar School (Cape Town)
 St. George's Grammar School (Hyderabad)

See also
 St. George's School (disambiguation)